Jiangsu Road is the name of a station on lines 2 and 11 of the Shanghai Metro. This is one of the stations that can refund the 20RMB deposit for the Shanghai Public Transportation Card.

Station Layout

References

Shanghai Metro stations in Changning District
Line 2, Shanghai Metro
Line 11, Shanghai Metro
Railway stations in China opened in 1999
Railway stations in Shanghai